Sabel is a Philippine romance primetime drama on ABS-CBN. It premiered on ABS-CBN's Primetime Bida evening block and worldwide on The Filipino Channel from December 6, 2010 to March 11, 2011 replacing Kokey at Ako. Starring Jessy Mendiola, AJ Perez, and Joseph Marco.

Plot 
When Choleng falls in love with a priest Julio, her life darkens when the townspeople get back at her when they find out Julio and Choleng are going to leave their community, thinking that Julio would leave his responsibilities in his home town where the village needs help and prayer to heal love ones. Little did she know that the night they would run away with their soon-to-be-born child to start a new life that a storm changed everything and when Julio gets into an accident leading him to his death one night as Sabel is born and with Julio's death, the townspeople think Choleng's daughter is a curse as bad things occur. She decides not to argue, and refuses and ignores the problems around her. She decides to give Sabel a better future by leaving the village and start a new life. And when Choleng and her mother Amparo are offered help by a common couple among dearest friends, they land a new life in a better community after baby Sabel got sick. But as she grew up, she fights for her family. And when her mother and grandmother great fear of her true identity and look for her father, Choleng does everything in her power and even falls for Jimmy but Margaret is desperate for Jimmy. But, her mother refuses Jimmy's true sincerity and love and even offers her to get married and accepts anything that has happened to her in the past. But, Choleng and Sabel's love for Jimmy and accepting him as a father will only mean to Choleng that she does not want to lose him as for Sabel as she grows up. And even for love, there is a solace she finds this into Dido and Raymond. But time comes again when she will follow into the same situation her mother was in and this time will time repeat itself. Is love a sin when one's feelings are true as she shows the townspeople and people around her that she is not cursed with this life and that life has no meaning without love?

Cast

Main cast

Supporting cast

Recurring cast

Extended cast
Spanky Manikan† as Tino
 Bryan Homecillo as Jefferson
 Shey Bustamante as Kimberly
 Natasha Cabrera  as Twinkle 
Eagle Riggs as Donna 
Aldred Gatchalian as Alvin
DJ Durano as Father Manny
Chinggoy Alonzo†  as Father John

Special participation
Tonton Gutierrez as Julio de Dios 
Precious Lara Quigaman as Cassandra Zaragosa 
Mutya Orquia as Young Sabel Asuncion 4 years old
Abby Bautista as Young Sabel Asuncion 8 years old
Diamond Delani as Young Candido "Dido" De Dios
Rusianne Jandrisa Ilao as Young Raymond Sandoval
Kimberly Fulgar as Young Twinkle

Development 
After five years in showbiz, Jessy Mendiola is now in the line of one Kapamilya Drama Princesses who are now all full-fledged drama heroines. After Mendiola's participation in the hit teleserye Kung Tayo'y Magkakalayo, she was given the primetime soap Sabel, based on the 1981 classic movie Bata Pa Si Sabel—which starred award-winning film and television icons Snooky Serna and Albert Martinez, under Regal Films—and like many classic films under Regal Entertainment that were classics such as Underage, which was used as a Your Song Sunday presentation. Sabel was the last teleserye of AJ Perez before his death on April 17, 2011 from a Dagupan show and was riding a van on his way home with his family.

Audience and critical reception

Syndication

See also
List of programs broadcast by ABS-CBN
List of telenovelas of ABS-CBN

References

External links

ABS-CBN drama series
2010 Philippine television series debuts
2011 Philippine television series endings
Television series by Dreamscape Entertainment Television
Philippine romance television series
Live action television shows based on films
Filipino-language television shows
Television shows set in the Philippines